Lienert is a surname. Notable people with the surname include:

Anton Lienert-Brown (born 1995), New Zealand rugby union player 
Brian Lienert (born 1943), Australian rules footballer
Daniel Lienert-Brown (born 1993), New Zealand rugby union player
Jarrod Lienert (born 1994), Australian rules footballer
Konrad Lienert (1933–2014), Austrian pair skater
Meinrad Lienert (1865 –1933), Swiss poet
Ron Lienert (born 1945), Australian rules footballer
Walter Lienert (1925–2012), American gymnastics coach and judge

See also
Lienert Cosemans (born 1993), Belgian volleyball player

References